Hasanabad (also Romanized as Ḩasanābād) is a village in Khobriz Rural District, in the Central District of Arsanjan County, Fars Province, Iran. At the 2006 census, its population was 452, in 92 families.

References 

Populated places in Arsanjan County